Eva Bella (born June 3, 2002) is an American actress, known as the voice of young Elsa in the Disney movie Frozen.

Early life
Eva Bella was born in Omaha, Nebraska. She has been acting since the age of seven, her first role was for a television commercial. She has had roles in several movies and television shows since then, most notably as the voice of young Elsa in Frozen and Frozen II and as Shimmer in Shimmer and Shine.

Filmography

Film

Television

Video games

References

External links
 

2002 births
Living people
Actresses from Omaha, Nebraska
American child actresses
American film actresses
American television actresses
American video game actresses
American voice actresses
21st-century American actresses